NIGHT is an art/fashion/music/literature/nightlife periodical co-edited by Anton Perich and Robert Henry Rubin. Established in Manhattan, New York, in 1978  the magazine was created  during the punk-new wave-disco nightclub era of among others; Studio 54, Xenon, Club A, Regine's, The Continental, Hurrah's, Danceteria, and the Mudd Club. Today the magazine continues to focus on the beautiful, the exclusive, the intelligent and the controversial.  Among the contributors have been Charles Plymell, Helmut Newton. Taylor Mead, Harold Stevenson, Victor Bockris, Lee Klein, Charles Henri Ford and countless others.

References

External links
 Official website
Warhol Stars

Lifestyle magazines published in the United States
Magazines established in 1978
Magazines published in New York City